The 1995 Philadelphia Wings season marked the team's ninth season of operation.

Game log
Reference:

(p) - denotes playoff game

Roster
Reference:

See also
 Philadelphia Wings
 1995 MILL season

References

Philadelphia Wings seasons
Philly
1995 in lacrosse